The President of the Supreme Court of Israel is one of the judges of the Supreme Court of Israel, who serves as head of the body, and as result has a significant impact on the judiciary system in Israel.

The current president of the court is Esther Hayut, who was sworn into the position on 26 October 2017.

Selection Process 
In accordance with section 4(a) of the Basic Law: The Judiciary, the president of the Supreme Court is appointed by the President of Israel, according to the recommendation of the Judicial Selection Committee. By convention, the selection is made in order of seniority, by which the longest-serving judge is designated when the outgoing president completes his or her term. Accordingly, judges appointed at a young age have a relatively higher likelihood of eventually serving as president. Several justice ministers, including Haim Ramon, Daniel Friedmann, Ayelet Shaked, and Yariv Levin have attempted to end the seniority discipline but the practice has remained unchanged.

The length of tenure as a judge in Israel is limited: section 13 of the Courts Law mandates that a judge's term concludes at the mandatory retirement age of 70. In an amendment to the courts law, approved in 2007, it was determined that the tenure of a Supreme Court president is seven years from the date of appointment, with no possibility of reappointment.

Also in the amendment to the Courts Law approved in July 2007, passed at the initiative of Justice Minister Daniel Friedmann, it was enacted that a Supreme Court president should not be appointed within three years of retirement age. However, in January 2012, the Knesset amended the law and annulled that limitation, at the initiative of MK Ya'akov Katz. The decision was known as the "Grunis Law," as it made possible for the appointment of Asher Grunis to Supreme Court president soon after its passage.

Powers 
The Courts Law of 1984 designates the following unique powers to the President of the Supreme Court:

 Various appointments of judges, such as appointment of a judge to preside in a higher position, are taken under the authority of the Justice Minister, but with the approval of the President of the Supreme Court. In some other cases it is also required for the minister to consult with the president of the court.
 The President of the Supreme Court determines the size and composition of the Disciplinary Tribunal of Judges.
 The Supreme Court typically hears cases as a panel of three judges, however, at the discretion of the President in specific cases the court may sit as a panel of a larger uneven number of Judges.
 The judge or judges presiding over a specific matter brought to the court are determined by the President of the Supreme Court.
 The President of the Supreme Court can disqualify a judge from ruling on a particular case, if he or she believes there may exist a conflict of interest.

Other powers were established in the Basic Law: The Judiciary:

 The President of the Supreme Court serves as one of the members of Israel's Judicial Selection Committee.
 The President of the Supreme Court and the Chair of the Judicial Selection Committee can initiate proceedings to remove a judge from the court.
 The permanent transfer of a judge from one court to another requires the approval of the President of the Supreme Court or the Disciplinary Tribunal of Judges.
 The activities of a judge in outside employment or in a public role are permitted only by law or with the approval of the President of the Supreme Court and the Justice Minister.
 If a judge is the subject of a complaint before the Disciplinary Tribunal of Judges, or the under criminal investigation or a criminal charge, the President of the Supreme Court may suspend the judge for a length of time at his or her discretion.

In accordance with the Commissions of Inquiry Law of 1968, after the decision is made to form a State Commission of Inquiry, the President of the Supreme Court determines its composition.

List of presidents 

In accordance with the seniority rule, the next Supreme Court presidents are expected to be:

Deputy president 

In 1953, President of the Supreme Court Moshe Smoira fell ill, and Justice Minister Pinchas Rosen initiated the position of a permanent Acting President of the Supreme Court who could step in should Judge Smoira's condition prevent him from discharging his duties. Indeed, in December 1953, when Smoira ceased working, Yitzhak Olshan was appointed the first Acting President by the Selection Committee.

In 1984, at the initiative of Meir Shamgar, who had been appointed a judge a year earlier, the Judges Law was amended and the title "Permanent Acting President of the Supreme Court" was replaced by "Deputy President of the Supreme Court." The first person to hold the new title was Miriam Ben-Porat.

The Deputy President of the Supreme Court is subject to similar restrictions to those that fall on the appointment of the President of the Supreme Court: the term ends at the mandatory retirement age of 70; and in accordance with Amendment 45 to the Courts Law in 2007, the length of term as Deputy President is seven years without possibility of reappointment.

While the position of President of the Supreme Court is vacant and until the new president begins to serve, or if the President is out of the country, or if the President is temporarily incapacitated from fulfilling his or her duty, the Deputy President carries out the functions of the President.

The President of the Supreme Court is permitted to delegate his or her responsibilities to the Deputy President.

List of Deputy Presidents and Acting Presidents of the Supreme Court 

After the retirement of Judge Salim Joubran on 4 August 2017, there was no judge serving as Deputy President until the appointment of Hanan Melcer on 30 October 2017. In accordance with the seniority rule, it was expected for Esther Hayut to be appointed Deputy President on 4 August 2017 (after Judge Joubran's retirement), but she declined and on 5 September she presented her candidacy for president as did Melcer for Deputy President.

The following table presents the judges expected to serve as Deputy President of the Supreme Court:

See also 

 Judiciary of Israel
 Judicial Selection Committee (Israel)
 Supreme Court of Israel
 Basic Laws of Israel

References 

Chief justices of the Supreme Court of Israel